The Mahmood Mosque is a mosque in Malmö, Skåne County, Sweden.

History
The mosque construction project started in 1999. The mosque was officially opened on 13 May 2016 during Friday sermon delivered by Mirza Masroor Ahmad and inaugurated a day after in a ceremony attended by the Chairperson of Malmö City Council.

Architecture
The 2,000 m2 mosque complex consist of 5 buildings, which also includes two-bedroom accommodation, sports hall, offices and a library. The mosque consist of two prayer halls, one for male and the other for female. In total, the mosque can accommodate up to 1,700 worshipers. It was constructed with a total cost of SEK37.5 million.

See also
 Islam in Sweden
 Ahmadiyya in Sweden
 List of mosques in Scandinavia

References

2016 establishments in Sweden
Buildings and structures in Malmö
Mosques completed in 2016
Mosques in Sweden